Stigmella perpygmaeella is a moth of the family Nepticulidae, found in most of Europe, east to Russia. The larvae mine the leaves of hawthorns.

Life cycle
The wingspan is 5–6 mm. The thick erect hairs on the head vertex are yellow-white and the collar is also yellow-white. Antennal eyecaps yellow-white. Forewings are dark grey brown wth purple at the apex. Hindwings are grey. Adults are on wing in May and August.

Ovum
Eggs are usually laid on the upperside of a hawthorn leaf, beside the midrib.

Larvae
The larvae are yellow with a brown head. They feed on woodland hawthorn (Crataegus laevigata) and common hawthorn (Crataegus monogyna), mining their leaves. The mine
consists of a compact, twisting corridor that twists back on itself and widens into a false blotch. The early gallery is filled with brown frass and is broad. Later the frass is coiled. The mine is constrained between two veins, or less frequently, a lateral vein and the leaf margin. Mines can be found in July and October. The mine of Stigmella crataegella is similar but the initial gallery is thinner and the larva is green.

Pupa
In a dull pink cocoon, spun in detritus.

Distribution
Stigmella perpygmaeella is found in most of Europe, from Ireland, east to Russia.

Etymology
Stigmella perpygmaeella was originally named pygmaeus, (i.e. a small size) by the English entomologist, Adrian Haworth in 1828, from a specimen found in Chelsea, at that time in the county of Middlesex, England. As this name was already in use it was renamed by Henry Doubleday in 1859 with the specific name perpygmaeella. Haworth originally placed the moth in the genus, Tinea – a gnawing worm. Doubleday moved pygmaeus to the genus Nepticula – a grand daughter, the smallest member of a family (i.e. the small size of the moth) when he renamed it perpygmaeella. The genus Stigmella – ″stigma″, refers to the conspicuous (or occasionally metallic) small dot or a brand fascia on the forewing of many of the Stigmella species, or possibly the small size of the moths.

References

External links
 Swedish moths
 Stigmella perpygmaeella images at  Consortium for the Barcode of Life
 Nepticulidae from the Volga and Ural region
 lepiforum.de

Nepticulidae
Leaf miners
Moths described in 1859
Moths of Europe
Taxa named by Henry Doubleday